Grimace may refer to:
A type of facial expression usually of disgust, disapproval, or pain
Grimace (composer), a French composer active in the mid-to-late 14th century
Grimace (character), a McDonaldland marketing character developed to promote the restaurant's milkshakes
Grimace scale, a method of assessing the occurrence or severity of pain